Robert K. Holz,(b. 1930-2020)  is the  Erich W. Zimmermann Regents Professor Emeritus of Geography at  the University of Texas at Austin     He has courtesy appointments also in the departments of Middle Eastern Studies and  African and African American Studies, and was Director of its Center for Middle Eastern Studies,

Works
He wrote on the subject of remote sensing, Texas geography, and the geography of Egypt.
 Mendes I (coauthored with Emma Swan Hall; Bernard V Bothmer) Cairo : American Research Center in Egypt, 1980
The surveillant science; remote sensing of the environment,  First edition Boston, Houghton Mifflin, 1973;  2nd ed, New York: Wiley, 1985. According to WorldCat, the first ed. is in 453 libraries, the second in 252.  
The Size, Distribution, and Growth of the Texas Population, 1980 to 2030
 The Aswan High Dam
Third world colonias: Lower Rio Grande valley, Texas Austin Texas: Lyndon Johnson School of Public Affairs, 1993. :	
Texas and its history (coauthored with  Mildred P Mayhall; Samuel W Newman; Frank Oliver) Austin, 1972.

He also wrote a novel: 
A prayer for Juan Garza : drug culture in the Lower Rio Grande Valley of Texas  published in 2008.

References

 

American geographers